The Tokelau national netball team represents Tokelau in international netball. The team broke up in 2009, but reunited in 2019.

Competitive record

References

External links 
 Official webpage

National netball teams of Oceania
Netball